Pain Zarrin Kola (also Romanized as Pā’īn Zarrīn Kolā; also known as Zarrīn Kolā and Zarrīn Kolā-ye Pā’īn) is a village in Larim Rural District, Gil Khuran District, Juybar County, Mazandaran Province, Iran. At the 2006 census, its population was 1,093, in 304 families.

References 

Populated places in Juybar County